Dag Burgos (born 21 October 1966) is a Guatemalan cross-country skier.  He and his brother Ricardo both represented their country at the 1988 Winter Olympics in Calgary, where they each competed in the Men's 15 kilometre and the Men's 20 kilometre races.

In each case, the brothers completed the races, but were near to last place among the finishers. Dag came 80th out of 85 finishers in the 15 km race and 80th out of 87 finishers in the 30 km race.

References 
 

1966 births
Living people
Guatemalan male cross-country skiers
Olympic cross-country skiers of Guatemala
Cross-country skiers at the 1988 Winter Olympics